Peter Krasnow (20 August 1886 – 30 October 1979), born Feivish Reisberg, was a modernist and colorist artist known for his abstract wood sculptures and architectonic hard-edge paintings and drawings which were often based on Hebrew calligraphy and other subjects related to his Jewish heritage.  Krasnow lived in Los Angeles for most of his life.

Early life and education
Born in 1886 in Novohrad-Volynskyi, Russian Empire, he was an apprentice to his father, who was an interior decorator.  Krasnow emigrated to the United States in 1907 and graduated from the Art Institute of Chicago in 1916.

Career 
Krasnow first exhibited in the 1920s.  He settled in the Atwater Village neighborhood of Los Angeles in 1922, purchasing the land where he built his home and studio from Edward Weston, who was his friend and a fellow member of the early Los Angeles avant-garde. Krasnow lived there for over 50 years. His work was included in the exhibit that launched MOCA.  He received a National Endowment for the Arts fellowship in 1977.

Exhibitions 
 1922, Whitney Studio Club, New York (solo)
 1922, Los Angeles County Museum of Art, Los Angeles
 1923, MacDowell Club, Los Angeles (solo)
 1926, The Print Rooms, Los Angeles
 1927, Los Angeles County Museum of Art, Los Angeles
 1927, Temple Emanu-El, San Francisco
 1928, Oakland Municipal Art Gallery, Oakland (solo)
 1928, Seattle Society of Fine Arts, Seattle (solo)
 1928, Dalzell Hatfield Gallery, Los Angeles (solo)
 1928, Zeitlin Bookstore, Los Angeles (solo)
 1929, Scripps College, Claremont (solo)
 1930, Stendahl Galleries, Los Angeles (solo)
 1931, California Palace of Legion of Honor, San Francisco (solo)
 1934, Galerie Pierre, Paris (solo)
 1935, UCLA, Los Angeles
 1935, The Print Rooms, Los Angeles
 1935, California Pacific International Expo, San Diego
 1939, Fine Arts Gallery, San Diego
 1940, Stendahl Galleries, Los Angeles (solo)
 1940, UCLA, Los Angeles
 1954, Pasadena Art Institute, Pasadena
 1964, Scripps College, Claremont (solo)
 1975, Los Angeles Municipal Art Gallery, Los Angeles
 1976, San Francisco Museum of Art, San Francisco
 1977, Judah L. Magnes Museum, Berkeley
 1978, Skirball Museum, Hebrew Union College, Los Angeles
 1986, 1989, 1991, and 1993, Tobey C. Moss Gallery, Los Angeles

Artistic legacy 
In 2000, the Laguna Art Museum acquired over 500 pieces of his work.

References

Artists from Los Angeles
Painters from California
1886 births
1979 deaths
Atwater Village, Los Angeles
Emigrants from the Russian Empire to the United States
Ukrainian painters
Ukrainian male painters
20th-century American painters
American male painters
Jewish painters
Jewish American artists
Ukrainian Jews
School of the Art Institute of Chicago alumni
People from Volhynian Governorate
People from Zviahel
20th-century American male artists